Veřovice is a municipality and village in Nový Jičín District in the Moravian-Silesian Region of the Czech Republic. It has about 2,000 inhabitants.

Etymology

The German name Wernsdorf is derived from the lokator who founded the village named Werner. The Czech name is a transcription of the German name.

Geography
Veřovice is located on the Jičínka River. The northern part of the municipality lies in the Moravian-Silesian Foothills, the southern part lies in the Moravian-Silesian Beskids.

History
The first written mention of Veřovice is from 1411, however there is also an unverified mention from 1293. The village was probably founded in the second half of the 13th century, during the colonisation of the area.

Transport
Veřovice is located on the railway line from Valašské Meziříčí to Frýdlant nad Ostravicí.

Sights

The Velký Javorník mountain is one of the most visited tourist destination in the Moravian-Silesian Beskids. There is a -high wooden observation tower, a restaurant built in 1935, and a paragliding ramp.

The Church of the Assumption of the Virgin Mary dates from 1854. It replaced an old wooden church.

Twin towns – sister cities

Veřovice is twinned with:
 Hendungen, Germany
 Lampertswalde, Germany

References

External links

Villages in Nový Jičín District